IAEP may refer to:

 International Association of EMTs and Paramedics, a labor union
 International Association for Environmental Philosophy, a philosophical organization and publisher of the academic journal Environmental Philosophy